Bomdila Monastery is a Buddhist monastery in Arunachal Pradesh, northeastern India.

References

Buddhist monasteries in Arunachal Pradesh
Tibetan Buddhist monasteries and temples in India